It! The Terror from Beyond Space is an independently made 1958 American science fiction horror film, produced by Robert Kent, directed by Edward L. Cahn, that stars Marshall Thompson, Shawn Smith (Shirley Patterson), and Kim Spalding. The film was distributed by United Artists as a double feature with Curse of the Faceless Man.

The story involves Earth's second mission to Mars to discover the fate of the Challenge 141 and its crew. Only a single survivor is found still alive from that crashed spaceship. The survivor, the expedition's former commander, claims that his crew were killed by a hostile Martian life form. No one from the rescue ship believes him until the creature, now a stowaway, begins hunting the crew on their return trip to Earth.

The film's premise has been cited as an inspiration for screenwriter Dan O'Bannon's screenplay for Ridley Scott's classic 1979 film Alien.

Plot
In 1973, a nuclear-powered spaceship blasts off from Mars for Earth, bringing with it the sole survivor of the first mission, Col. Edward Carruthers. He is suspected of having murdered the other nine members of his crew for their food and water rations, on the premise that he had no way of knowing if or when an Earth rescue mission would ever arrive. Carruthers denies this allegation, attributing his crew's deaths to a hostile humanoid life form on the Red Planet.

Commander Col. Van Heusen is unconvinced and makes sure that Carruthers is constantly accompanied by another member of his crew. While the ship was on the Martian surface, an emergency hatch had been left open, allowing the creature easy access. The crew are at first skeptical that something crawled aboard while they were on Mars. However, when Kienholz investigates odd sounds coming from a lower level, he is killed and his body hidden in an air duct. Next is Gino Finelli. He is found, barely alive, but the creature attacks his would-be rescuer. Bullets have no effect, forcing the crewman to leave Gino behind, much to the distress of his brother Bob. An autopsy of Kienholz's body reveals that it has been sucked dry of all fluids.

The crew use hand grenades and gas grenades, but the creature proves to be immune to both. They next try electrocution, also with no effect. When "It" is tricked into going into the spaceship's atomic reactor room, they shut the heavily shielded door and expose the creature directly to the ship's nuclear pile. It easily crashes through the door and escapes. The creature is so strong that it can tear through the metal hatches separating each of the ship's levels. The survivors (except for an injured crewman, who is trapped below in a spot inaccessible to the creature) retreat to the control room on the topmost deck. When Carruthers notices the ship's higher-than-normal oxygen consumption rate, he surmises that this is due to the creature's larger lung capacity, needed for the thin Martian atmosphere. In a last desperate move, everyone puts on their spacesuits, and Carruthers opens the command deck's hull airlock directly to the vacuum of space. A violent decompression follows, and the plan works: "It" suffocates and finally expires, stuck part way through the final hatch.

A press conference is later held on Earth, revealing the details of what happened aboard the rescue ship. The project director emphasizes that Earth may now be forced to bypass the Red Planet "because another word for Mars is Death".

Cast

 Marshall Thompson as Col. Edward Carruthers
 Shirley Patterson as Ann Anderson (as Shawn Smith)
 Kim Spalding as Col. Van Heusen
 Dabbs Greer as Eric Royce
 Paul Langton as Lt. James Calder
 Robert Bice as Maj. John Purdue
 Richard Benedict as Bob Finelli
 Ann Doran as Mary Royce 
 Richard Hervey as Gino Finelli
 Thom Carney as Joe Kienholz
 Ray Corrigan as It

Production

It! The Terror from Beyond Space was financed by Edward Small and was originally known as It! The Vampire from Beyond Space. Principal photography took place over a two-week period during mid-January 1958. Small kept changing his mind over whether or not he wanted plastic eyes installed in the creature's mask, causing a lot of aggravation for the film's makeup artist, Paul Blaisdell.

It! was the last film of actor Ray "Crash" Corrigan. Corrigan was set to play the creature, but during pre-production, he did not want to travel over to Topanga Canyon in western Los Angeles County where Paul Blaisdell lived and operated his studio. Therefore, Blaisdell could not take exact measurements of Corrigan's head. Consequently, there were final fit problems with the creature's head prop: "[Corrigan's]...bulbous chin stuck out through the monster's mouth, so the make-up man painted his chin to look like a tongue." Blaisdell then added a bottom row of fangs that covered Corrigan's jutting chin. 

Blaisdell said working for United Artists wasn't nearly as happy an experience as working at AIP was for him. As filming progressed, Ray Corrigan turned up drunk on the set a few times, refused to follow certain directions from Ed Cahn and even damaged the monster suit, causing Blaisdell to be called in to do a couple of quick "patch-up" jobs. Blaisdell said it wasn't a happy set, what with Corrigan drunk on and off, and the film's female star Shawn Smith constantly in a bad mood, furious that she had been cast in a low-budget monster movie. Blaisdell said only Marshall Thompson seemed to be enjoying himself. The creature costume became the property of UA, and wound up a year later showing up in their 1959 John Agar opus, Invisible Invaders (without paying Blaisdell for reusing his props).

Reception

Variety noted that the creature was the star: "‘It’ is a Martian by birth, a Frankenstein by instinct, and a copycat. The monster dies hard, brushing aside grenades, bullets, gas and an atomic pile, before snorting its last snort. It’s old stuff, with only a slight twist". A retrospective film review by Dennis Schwartz favorably compared It! with Alien, a classic 1979 film that borrowed its creature feature plot liberally from its earlier counterpart.

Adaptations
In 1992, Millennium Publications adapted It! The Terror from Beyond Space as a short-run comic book series, written by Mark Ellis and Dean Zachary. A further comics adaptation was released by Midnite Movies (IDW Publishing) in 2010, for a three-issue run.

The film was shown on the MeTV show "Svengoolie" on February 5, 2022 and October 8, 2022.

See also
 List of films set on Mars

References

Notes

Bibliography

 Strick, Philip. Science Fiction Movies. London: Octopus Books Limited. 1976. .
 Palmer, Randy. Paul Blaisdell, Monster Maker: A Biography of the B Movie Makeup and Special Effects Artist. Jefferson, North Carolina: McFarland & Company, 1997. .
 Warren, Bill. Keep Watching the Skies: American Science Fiction Movies of the Fifties 21st Century Edition. 2009. McFarland & Company. .

External links

 
 
 
 
 
 Original soundtrack of Paul Sawtell's and Bert Shefter's score from It! The Terror From Beyond Space

1958 films
1958 horror films
1950s science fiction films
1950s science fiction horror films
American black-and-white films
American science fiction horror films
1950s English-language films
Films about astronauts
Films about extraterrestrial life
Films directed by Edward L. Cahn
Films set in 1973
Films set in the future
Mars in film
American monster movies
United Artists films
1950s monster movies
1950s independent films
Films scored by Paul Sawtell
American exploitation films
1950s American films